Prince Frederick Louis Charles of Prussia (Potsdam, 5 November 1773 – Berlin, 28 December 1796) was the second son and third child of Frederick William II of Prussia and Frederika Louisa of Hesse-Darmstadt.

Biography

Marriage and issue
On 26 December 1793 in Berlin, Prussia, Prince Louis married Duchess Frederica of Mecklenburg-Strelitz, youngest daughter of Charles II, Grand Duke of Mecklenburg-Strelitz and sister of Louise of Mecklenburg-Strelitz, wife of his brother Frederick. 

They had three children:
 Prince Frederick Wilhelm Ludwig of Prussia (30 October 1794 - 27 July 1863); married Princess Luise of Anhalt-Bernburg (1799–1882); father of Prince George and Prince Alexander of Prussia.
 Prince Charles of Prussia (26 September 1795 - 6 April 1798).
 Princess Frederica Wilhelmina Louise Amalia of Prussia (30 September 1796 - 1 January 1850); married Leopold IV, Duke of Anhalt-Dessau (1794–1871) and had issue.

Prince Louis Charles died aged 23 from diphtheria.

His widow went on to marry twice more, becoming Queen of Hanover by her last marriage.

Ancestry

References 

 Versuch eines Beitrags zur Charakteristik des Prinzen Friedrich Ludwig Karl von Preußen, Belitz & Braun, Berlín 1797. (Digitalized)

1773 births
1796 deaths
House of Hohenzollern
Prussian princes
Deaths from diphtheria
Burials at Berlin Cathedral
Sons of kings